Tébessa is the capital city of Tébessa Province, in the Shawi region of Algeria.

Tebessa may also refer to:

Tebessa Province, a province (wilaya) of Algeria
Tebessa District, an administrative district located in Tebessa Province
US Tébessa, a football club based in Tébessa

See also
Maximilian of Tebessa, Christian saint and martyr